The Lakshmana Tirtha (Lakshmantīrtha River) is a river of Karnataka, India. It rises in Kodagu district and flows eastward. It joins the Kaveri in the Krishna Raja Sagara lake.

The river originates at a height of 1450 metres in the Brahmagiri range of Kodagu district. Unlike Kaveri, Lakshmana Tirtha flows in relatively flat-terrain region of south coorg. Increase in the water level during monsoon, results in flooding of adjacent paddy fields. The river meanders throughout its course and enters Mysore district through Nagarahole National Park. Hunsur is located on the banks of this river and is the source of drinking water for the people of Hunsur. The river finally meets Kaveri at Krishna Raja Sagara reservoir at an elevation of 750 metres above MSL, after traversing a length of about 210 kilometres.

Threats
 The river generally runs dry few months after monsoon, due to ground water depletion and its constant exposure to direct sunlight and lack of shade from coffee estate; privilege that Kaveri enjoys during its course in Kodagu. 

 Pollution of its tributaries is a major concern. Waste is dumped into steams of Kuranthoad flowing near Ponnampet and Gonikoppal. Coffee wastewater from de-pulping coffee cherries is also a serious threat to the river.

 Illegal sand mining has been a major headache for the district administration.

Notes

Rivers of Karnataka
Tributaries of the Kaveri River
Geography of Mandya district
Geography of Kodagu district
Rivers of India